Crookram is an electronic music producer from the Netherlands, known for his extensive use of sampling in downtempo music. Crookram describes his sound as "cinematic, sample-based, downtempo soul music".

Biography
Crookram, whose real name is Chris Angelovski, is a musician from The Hague. In 2006, he was invited by the Hungarian Budabeats label, an internet-only operation, to release music through their website. Crookram had been brought to Budabeat's attention by a Hungarian musician, who had received a favourable review from Crookram via their MySpace page. His first release, 19/76, consisted of five tracks, all downloadable for free. Through Windows (2010) received significant airplay on VPRO's 3VOOR12. Angelovski said much of his inspiration and many of his samples come from his parents' record collection, which contained much 1970s jazzrock and jazzfunk.

Albums 
19/76 (2008)
 Hostile
 Tomorrow All Right
 Biggles
 Balboa
 A Day In The Life (feat. INC)

Escape, the E.P. (2009)
 Escape
 Make Way
 Warrior
 Patterns of Thought (feat. Wreckitnize)
 Epilogue

Through Windows (2010)
 Back To School
 Crookrilla
 Breakadawn
 Missione Pericolosa
 Bij De Rest
 Please Get Out Of The New One If You Can't Blend The Ancient
 Through Windows
 Two Seven Three Eleven
 Good Morning Good Days
 Makedonija
 Your Eyes Are Full Of Hate
 Bodies
 Badalamenti
 A Man Named Ivan
 Business Is Business
 Eugène Et Le Cerceau
 Sun
 The Confrontation
 I Saw You

Butterflies (2017)
 Flowers
 Bum Bum
 The Good, The Bad & The Gypsy
 Tabby Strut
 Peapod The Pocket Squirrel
 Little Marcos
 Mermaids
 For Your Lady
 Island
 A Sensible Man
 Silent City
 My Forest
 Un Canard
 Katmandu
 Puppy Love
 Like A Cat
 One More Time
 Starfield
 American Dream
 In The Future
 Butterflies

Clouds Are Free (2017)
 The Lick
 Safari
 Warm Hugs
 Number Song
 Magic Moon
 Clouds Are Free
 Swim Song
 C'est Si Simple
 A Friend Is A Treasure
 By The Way

Mixtapes 
 Downtempo mixtape (2008)
 Debutante, A Sex Tape (2014)

References

External links 
 

Dutch hip hop musicians
Living people
Year of birth missing (living people)